The 1971 Philadelphia mayoral election took place on November 2, 1971 to fill the 182nd mayoral term in Philadelphia, with Democratic nominee Frank Rizzo defeating Republican Thacher Longstreth. While Longstreth received many split ticket votes from Democrats, Rizzo found support among unions and the white working-class electorate. 

Rizzo was the first Italian-American mayor of Philadelphia, and would be reelected in 1975 before a failed attempt to change the city charter to allow him to run for a third term.

Democratic primary

Candidates

Declared
 William J. Green III, U.S. Representative from Pennsylvania's 5th congressional district
 Ira Einhorn, counterculture figure and future convicted murderer
 Frank Lomento, pretzel vendor
 James E. Poole
 Albert Sprague, member of Local 141 of the Lithographers and Photo Engravers International Union
 Frank Rizzo, Police Commissioner and acting Mayor
 Hardy Williams, State Representative from the 191st district

Withdrew
  David Cohen, former City Councilman (endorsed Green)

Campaign
Rizzo had a reputation for his harsh policing style, and as called "the toughest cop in America". He began his candidacy as the frontrunner for the nomination, with the endorsement of the city's Democratic organization.

Rizzo refused to debate or attend the same events as his opponents. Green refused to discuss most issues, and avoided interviews or written questions by the media or civic groups. He also refused to join his opponents in testifying on the city's financial problems before the Philadelphia City Council. Rizzo also did not make many campaign appearances, making only a single appearance a day and only appearing in white ethnic neighborhoods considered to be friendly towards him.

Rizzo repeatedly insisted that he was "not a politician". Rizzo took a position against additional taxes.

Rizzo had earned goodwill with many voters, who perceived his command of the police department as having staved off the sort of violent rioting other cities had experienced years earlier.

Green warned voters that it would be a "disaster" if America's then-fourth largest city were to be led by Rizzo.

Liberal politicians primarily supported Green. Shortly before the primary, governor Milton Shapp endorsed Green (after which Rizzo attacked Shapp's record).

Green's camp had attempted to get Williams to withdraw, in order to unite liberal voters around Green and against Rizzo. Williams refused.

Williams was the first well-known African American to run for mayor of Philadelphia.

After Shapp accused Rizzo of police brutality and Pennsylvania Attorney General J . Shane Creamer found Rizzo guilty of having beaten a black demonstrator in 1965, Rizzo dismissed this as a political "cheap shot".

The Philadelphia Bulletin argued that the real race was not between Rizzo and Green, but between incumbent mayor Tate and governor Shapp for control of the Philadelphia Democratic Party. This newspaper declined to endorse a candidate.

Results

Republican primary

Candidates

Declared
 Thacher Longstreth, At-large City Councilman and candidate for Mayor in 1955

Results
Longstreth faced only nominal opposition for the nomination.

Independents and third parties

Conservative
 Joseph J. Frieri, candidate for Mayor in 1971

Constitution
 Clarissa Cain, candidate for City Controller in 1969 and Governor in 1970

Socialist Labor
 George S. Taylor, perennial candidate

Socialist Workers
 Jean Savage

General election

Campaign

Rizzo's campaign slogan "Rizzo means business". Rizzo benefited from white racial backlash. He campaigned primarily in white, working class areas of the city.

Results

References

1971
Philadelphia
1971 Pennsylvania elections
1970s in Philadelphia